Friends is the sixth album by American R&B group Shalamar, released in 1982 on the SOLAR label.  The album, which features the 'classic' Shalamar line-up (Jeffrey Daniel, Howard Hewett and Jody Watley), topped the R&B chart and peaked at #35 on the Billboard chart. It has been certified Gold in the United States for sales over 500,000. It would eventually go Platinum.
In the United Kingdom Friends gained impetus from a now-legendary demonstration of body-popping by Daniel during a performance of "A Night to Remember" on the BBC programme Top of the Pops.  It reached #6 on the UK Albums Chart and produced four top 20 singles.

In 2002, Friends was re-released by Sanctuary Records in the United Kingdom in a double-CD package with Shalamar's previous album Go for It.

Track listing

Personnel

Shalamar
Jeffrey Daniel - lead & backing vocals
Howard Hewett - lead & backing vocals
Jody Watley - lead & backing vocals

Musical Personnel
Leon Sylvers III - bass, percussion, keyboards
Wardell Potts, Jr. - drums
Foster Sylvers - bass
Joey Gallo - keyboards
Kevin Spencer - keyboards
James Ingram - bass, keyboards
Ricky Sylvers - guitar
Ed Green - drums
Ernest "Pepper" Reed - guitar
Richard Randolph - guitar
Michael Nash - keyboards
William Shelby - keyboards
Wayne Milstein - percussion

Charts

Weekly charts

Year-end charts

Singles

Certifications

See also
List of number-one R&B albums of 1982 (U.S.)

References

External links
 Shalamar-Friends at Discogs

Shalamar albums
1982 albums
SOLAR Records albums
Albums produced by Leon Sylvers III